The Madeira River is a major waterway in South America. The Madeira is the biggest tributary of the Amazon, accounting for about 15% of the water in the basin. A map from Emanuel Bowen in 1747, held by the David Rumsey Map Collection, refers to the Madeira by the pre-colonial, indigenous name Cuyari. The River of Cuyari, called by the Portuguese Madeira or the Wood River, is formed by two great rivers, which join near its mouth. It was by this River, that the Nation of Topinambes passed into the River Amazon.

Climate

Course

Between Guajará-Mirim and the falls of Teotônio, the Madeira receives the drainage of the north-eastern slopes of the Andes from Santa Cruz de la Sierra to Cuzco, the whole of the south-western slope of Brazilian Mato Grosso and the northern slope of the Chiquitos sierras. The waters flow into the Madeira from many large rivers, the principal of which, (from east to west), are the Guaporé or Iténez, the Baures and Blanco, the Itonamas or San Miguel, the Mamoré, Beni, and Madre de Dios or Mayutata, all of which are reinforced by numerous secondary but powerful affluents. The climate of the upper catchment area varies from humid in the western edge with the origin of the river's main stem by volume (Río Madre de Dios, Río Beni) to semi arid in the southernmost part with the Andine headwaters of the main stem by length (Río Caine, Río Rocha, Río Grande, Mamoré).

From its source in the confluence of Madre de Dios and Mamoré rivers and downstream to Abuna River the Madeira flows northward forming border between Bolivia and Brazil. Below its confluence with the latter tributary the flow of river changes to north-eastward direction, inland of Rondônia state of Brazil. The section of the river from the border to Porto Velho has notable drop of bed and was not navigable. Before 2012 the falls of Teotônio and of San Antônio existed here, they had higher flow rate and bigger level drop than more famous Boyoma Falls in Africa. Currently these rapids are submerged by the reservoir of Santo Antônio Dam. Below Porto Velho the Madeira meanders north-eastward through the Rondônia and Amazonas states of north west Brazil to its junction with the Amazon.

The  Rio Madeira Sustainable Development Reserve, created in 2006, extends along the north bank of the river opposite the town of Novo Aripuanã.
At its mouth is Ilha Tupinambaranas, an extensive marshy region formed by the Madeira's distributaries.

Navigation
The Madeira-Mamoré Railroad runs in a  loop around the unnavigable section to Guajará-Mirim on the Mamoré River, but is not functional, limiting shipping from the Atlantic at Porto Velho.

Today, it is also one of the Amazon basin's most active waterways, and helps export close to four million tons of grains, which are loaded onto barges in Porto Velho, where both Cargill and Amaggi have loading facilities, and then shipped down the Madeira to the ports of Itacoatiara, near the mouth of the Madeira, just upstream on the left bank of the Amazon, or further down the Amazon, to the port of Santarem, at the mouth of the Tapajos River. From these two ports, Panamax-type ships then export the grains - mainly soy and corn - to Europe and Asia. The Madeira waterway is also used to take fuel from the REMAN refinery (Petrobras) in Manaus, state capital of Amazonas, to Porto Velho, from where the states of Acre, Rondônia and parts of Mato Grosso are supplied mainly with gasoline (petrol) refined in Manaus. Cargo barges also use the Madeira on the route between Manaus and Porto Velho, which is  along the Rio Negro, Amazon and Madeira, connecting Manaus' industrial district with the rest of Brazil, as Manaus is land-locked as far as logistics with the rest of the country are concerned, to bring in part of its raw materials, and export its produce to the major consumer centres of São Paulo and Rio de Janeiro. In 2012, the cargo amounted to 287,835 tons (both directions). The total tonnage shipped in 2012 on the Madeira accounted to 5,076,014.

Two large dams (see below) are under construction as part of the IIRSA regional integration project. The dam projects include large ship-locks capable of moving oceangoing vessels between the impounded reservoir and the downstream river.

Ecology

As typical of Amazonian rivers with the primary headwaters in the Andes, the Madeira River is turbid because of high sediment levels and it is whitewater, but some of its tributaries are clearwater (e.g., Aripuanã and Ji-Paraná) or blackwater (e.g., Manicoré).

The Bolivian river dolphin, variously considered a subspecies of the Amazon river dolphin or a separate species, is restricted to the upper Madeira River system. It has been estimated that there are more than 900 fish species in the Madeira River Basin, making it one of the freshwater systems in the world with the highest species richness.

In popular culture
The river is the fifth title of the 1993/1999 Philip Glass album Aguas da Amazonia.

Dams
In July 2007, plans have been approved by the Brazilian Government to construct two hydroelectric dams on the Madeira River, the Santo Antônio Dam near Porto Velho and the Jirau Dam about 100 km upstream.  Both the Jirau and Santo Antonio dams are run-of-the-river projects that do not impound a large reservoir.  Both dams also feature some environmental re-mediation efforts (such as fish ladders).  As a consequence, it has been suggested that there has not been strong environmental opposition to the implementation of the Madeira river complex.  Yet, if the fish ladders fail, "several valuable migratory fish species could suffer near-extinction as a result of the Madeira dams."

There are also concerns with deforestation and pressure on conservation areas and indigenous peoples' territories.
The Worldwatch institute has also criticized the fast-track approval process for "kindler, gentler dams with smaller reservoirs, designed to lessen social and environmental impacts", claiming that no project should "fast-track the licensing of new dams in Amazonia and allow projects to circumvent Brazil's tough environmental laws".

Languages

Indigenous languages of the upper Madeira River basin (in Brazil, Bolivia, and Peru):

Note: † = extinct language

References

External links

The Amazon and Madeira Rivers: Sketches and Descriptions from the Note-Book of an Explorer from 1875

Rivers of Amazonas (Brazilian state)
Rivers of Rondônia
Tributaries of the Amazon River
Rivers of Pando Department